The Little Green Man is an animated cartoon series about a boy called Sydney Keets, nicknamed "Skeets", who befriends the inquisitive, friendly alien Little Green Man, nicknamed "Greenie", when his spaceship lands in Skeets' garden. Bar a few minor instances, such as the family cat, Skeets is the only character able to see Greenie, and along with Greenie's small friend Zoom Zoom, they share a series of fantastical adventures together, each serving to educate Greenie about life on Earth in some way or another.

Development
Created by Matthew Smith, The Little Green Man had originally been read as a story in a 1983 episode of the popular, long-running Thames Television children's series Rainbow. The story, telling of Greenie's first arrival on Earth and meeting Sydney, before heading off back home in the evening sky at the end of the tale, was written by Smith and read by show presenter Geoffrey Hayes. The story proved popular with young viewers and two follow-up tales were soon commissioned for the 1984 series; In the meantime, it was felt that there was enough potential for the characters to have their own series of 15 minute adventures, following on from Cockleshell Bay and Button Moon, which had both received their own series after first appearing as stories in Rainbow.

In mid-1984 a pilot was commissioned, The Visitor from Space (which re-tells the story of Greenie's first landing on Earth as previously told on Rainbow, with very minor modifications), after which Thames, who were up to their annual budget for children's output at the time, passed production of the series over to Central Television, who commissioned twelve episodes to bring the total up to thirteen. Each episode was written by Smith, and narrated by Jon Pertwee. A second series of stories was optioned, but ultimately not commissioned following the internal restructuring of the yearly children's television output by the major ITV regions in 1986.

Episodes 
The Visitor from Space (03.01.1985)
There's No Fun Like Snow Fun (10.01.1985)
Up, Up and Away (17.01.1985)
Greenie Through the Looking Glass (24.01.1985)
Help for the Duke (31.01.1985)
Monkey Tricks (07.02.1985)
Skeets' Scarf (14.02.1985)
A Trip to the Circus (21.02.1985)
An Adventure in Space (28.02.1985) 
A Fishy Tale (07.03.1985)
A Bicycle Made for Three? (14.03.1985)
The Shopping Expedition (21.03.1985)
Skeets' Sandcastle (28.03.1985)

Broadcast History
United Kingdom - ITV (1985, 1986, 1988), The Children's Channel (1991-1992)
New Zealand - TV One (1986)
Australia - Max (1995)
Brazil - TV Cultura (as part of Glub Glub; 1990-1994)

External links
 
Toonhound
UK Favourites - Classic British TV and Film

1985 British television series debuts
1985 British television series endings
1980s British children's television series
1980s British animated television series
ITV children's television shows
Television series by ITV Studios
English-language television shows
Television shows produced by Central Independent Television